Bronchocela orlovi, Orlov's forest lizard, is a species of lizard. It is endemic to Vietnam

References

Bronchocela
Reptiles described in 2004
Taxa named by Jakob Hallermann
Reptiles of Vietnam